Kuhmareyi is one of the languages of southwestern Fars. Davani had an estimated 1,000 speakers in 2004.

Phonology
The transcription used here is only an approximation.

Vowels
short: a, e, i, o, u
long: â, ā, ē, ī, ō, ū

Consonants
voiced dental fricative: ð, generally after vowels, like in, 'bað' (bad).
voiced velar fricative: γ, like in "γal'ati" (shroud).
alveolar trill: like in 'borrâ' (flail).
palatalization: inclination for 'g' and 'k' before front vowels, like in 'bega' (say).
voiceless alveolar affricate: ts, like in 'tse' (what), and voiced dz, like in andzi (fig).

Grammar

Verbs
Davani is ergative in past transitive constructions.  For example (Persian transliterations are in UniPers):

English: Hasan saw Ali in the garden.
Persian: Hasan,      Ali-râ tuye bâq did.
Davani:  hasan-eš   ali-a   tu    bâγ di.

Infinitive markers include -san, -tan, -dan, -ðan.

Nouns
The suffix -aku makes nouns definite.  For example:

bard "stone" → bard-aku "the stone"

The plural is marked by the suffix -gal. -u is exceptionally used for "man".  For example:

sēv "apple" → sēv-gal "apples"
merd "man" → merd-u "men"

Pronouns

Vocabulary

Example sentences

See also
 Lari dialect
 Dialects of Fars
 Persian dialects and varieties
 Southwestern Iranian languages
 Iranian languages

References

Further reading
Morgenstierne, G., 1960. Stray notes on Persian dialects, II, Fârs Dialects-Davâni. Norsk Tidsskrift for Sprogvidenskap, XIX, 123–129.
Hasamzada-Haqiqi, C., 1970. Guyeše Davâni (Davani Dialect), in Proceedings of the First Congress of Iranian Studies. Tehran University, 77–98.
Mahamedi, H., 1979. On the verbal system in three Iranian dialects of Fârs, in Studia Iranica, VIII, 2, 277–297.
Salami, A., 1381 AP / 2002 AD. Farhange guyeše Davâni (The Dictionary of Davani dialect). The academy of Persian language and literature.   (in Persian).

External links
Encyclopædia Iranica article on Davani
Davani sayings

Fars Province
Languages of Iran
Southwestern Iranian languages
Endangered Iranian languages